Golden Skies is the second studio album by American electronic musician Mono/Poly. It was released via Brainfeeder on August 26, 2014. It features contributions from Mendee Ichikawa of Free Moral Agents, Rebekah Raff, Niki Randa, and Thundercat.

Critical reception

Andy Kellman of AllMusic gave the album 4 stars out of 5, stating that it is "more complex, finessed, and melodic" than Mono/Poly's first studio album, Paramatma (2010). Matthew Phillips of Tiny Mix Tapes gave the album 3 stars out of 5, commenting that "Golden Skies sleek beat structures leave just enough room for the complexity of the synthesis to shine before the melody pulls away your attention." Nate Patrin of Pitchfork gave the album a 7.3 of 10, writing, "The big hook on Golden Skies to pull listeners in centers around just what Mono/Poly does with well-known synthesizer sounds." He added, "The record resembles a lot of recent Brainfeeder-y stuff you might've heard before, except tinkered with a bit and with a more dazed approach to the cosmic allusions of Ras G's Back on the Planet, or the euphoric disorientation of Flying Lotus' Until the Quiet Comes and Thundercat's Apocalypse." Rory Foster of The Line of Best Fit gave the album a 7 out of 10, calling it "a distinctly spiritual journey, a soundtrack to the heavens, and not a bad one to boot."

Track listing

References

External links
 
 

2014 albums
Brainfeeder albums
Electronic albums by American artists